Reflector may refer to:

Science
 Reflector, a device that causes reflection (for example, a mirror or a retroreflector)
 Reflector (photography), used to control lighting contrast
 Reflecting telescope
 Reflector (antenna), the part of an antenna that reflects radio waves
 Reflector (cipher machine), a component of some rotor machines in cryptography
Reflector (microsatellite), space debris research microsatellite
 Reflector, the newsletter of the Boston section of the Institute of Electrical and Electronics Engineers
 Reflector, in math, the left adjoint in a reflective subcategory
 Neutron reflector, in physics

Computing
 .NET Reflector, code browser utility
 Reflector, in an electronic mailing list, a single email address that reflects (sends/remails) a copy of an email sent to it to other email addresses
 Reflector router, used in a distributed reflected denial of service attack (DRDoS)
 Reflector (cellular automaton), a type of pattern
 Reflector, conferencing system used in the Internet Radio Linking Project

Music
 Reflector (Pablo Cruise album), a 1981 album by Pablo Cruise
 Reflector (Killing Heidi album), a 2000 album by Killing Heidi
 Reflector (PlanetShakers album), a 2002 album by PlanetShakers
 Reflector (band), a rock band based in Beijing

Other uses
 Reflector (Transformers), a fictional character in the Transformers toyline of the 1980s
 The Reflector (disambiguation), several newspapers
 The Daily Reflector, an eastern North Carolina-based newspaper
 Safety reflector, a retroreflector intended for pedestrians or vehicles

See also
 Reflektor, a 2013 Arcade Fire album
 
 
 Reflection (disambiguation)